Kathi Mahesh Kumar (1977/8 – 10 July 2021) was an Indian film critic and actor working in Telugu cinema. He appeared on the Telugu reality TV show Bigg Boss.

Personal life 
Kathi Mahesh Kumar hailed from Yellamanda, a village in Chittoor district in Andhra Pradesh. He was born into a dalit family and belongs to Madiga community. He studied at AP Residential School at Gyarampalle near Piler. He studied MA Communication at Hyderabad Central University during 1998–2000.

Mahesh was a vocal supporter of Y. S. Jagan Mohan Reddy and YSR Congress Party in the past and spoke in favour of Jagan Mohan Reddy in several television debates. He backed YSR Congress Party during the 2021 bye-elections for the Tirupati Lok Sabha constituency.

Career
Mahesh started his career with Edari Varsham, based on Devarakonda Balagangadhara Tilak's story Vuri Chivara Illu. He was a co-writer of the film Minugurulu, the "first Telugu script to be preserved in the Oscar Library's permanent core collection" and the first Telugu film to contend for the Academy Awards' best feature film (2014).

In his next film, the 2015 romantic comedy Pesarattu, he used flowcam technology popularized by Ram Gopal Varma. It was the first crowd funded short film in Telugu. He played minor roles in the Telugu movies Hrudaya Kaleyam (2014), Kiss Kiss Bang Bang (2017), and Kobbari Matta (2019). 

In 2017, he appeared in season 1 of the Telugu reality show Bigg Boss, hosted by Jr. NTR and telecast on Star Maa.

His last film, Egise Tarajuvvualu, touched on the need for developing scientific temperament among children.

Criticism on Telugu films 
Mahesh rose to prominence for his sharp and controversial reviews on Telugu films. He had been a panelist on television news channels, often defending rationalist views. He accuses Tollywood of being casteist and feels that Telugu films lack new ideas and fail to address social issues.

In March 2017, he critically reviewed Pawan Kalyan's movie, Katamarayudu, and called the movie "a badly written film" with "a predictable screenplay". He also said that the movie was sexist and has a lot of derogatory comments against women. Soon after, he was trolled online and cyberbullied with abuses and threats on his Facebook wall, allegedly by Pawan Kalyan's fans.

Other works 
Mahesh worked with UNICEF, World Bank, Save the Children and the Clinton Foundation.

Legal issues 
Mahesh was banned from entering Hyderabad on 9 July 2018 for a period of six months by the Telangana police, under the Telangana Prevention of Anti-Social and Hazardous Activities Act, 1980, for allegedly calling Rama a "cheat" and claiming that Sita would have been better off with Ravana, during a debate, about a sedition case filed against Babu Gogineni, in a regional news channel. He was dropped at his native place in Chittoor district by the police. He defended his comments citing his right to freedom of speech.

A case was filed against him in February 2020 for referring to Rama as having mistresses and Sita wishing to eat the golden deer Rama was chasing, during an anti-CAA event held in Osmania University, Hyderabad.

Death 
On 25 June 2021, Mahesh met with an accident when his car collided with a truck near Nellore, when he was travelling from Chittoor towards Hyderabad. He was admitted to Medicover Hospitals in Nellore with severe head and eye injuries. The hospital stated that his health was in critical condition and then he was shifted to the ICU. He was shifted to Apollo Hospitals in Chennai for better treatment. He died on 10 July at the age of 43. He was survived by his wife and a son. His last rites were performed on 12 July at his native village of Yellamanda.

Filmography

Films

Television

References

External links

1970s births
Year of birth uncertain
2021 deaths
21st-century Indian male actors
Male actors in Telugu cinema
Screenwriters from Andhra Pradesh
Telugu screenwriters
Male actors from Andhra Pradesh
Telugu male actors
Indian male film actors
Bigg Boss (Telugu TV series) contestants
University of Hyderabad alumni
People from Chittoor district